Glen Miller Campbell (September 23, 1916 – February 1, 2005) was a Canadian curler. He played as second on a team consisting of 3 of his brothers, winning the 1955 Brier.

References

1916 births
2005 deaths
Curlers from Regina, Saskatchewan
Royal Canadian Air Force personnel of World War II
Brier champions
Canadian male curlers